Sir Austin "William" Pearce  (1 September 1921 – 21 March 2004) was the chairman of British Aerospace from 1980 until 1987. He was educated at Devonport High School for Boys, Plymouth and the University of Birmingham.

In 1942 he left university with a degree in Chemical Engineering and joined the Petroleum Warfare Department working on incendiary devices at the same time as his doctorate.

He began his industrial career with the Agwi Petroleum Corporartion.  When this became part of Esso he rose rapidly, eventually becoming managing director in 1968. In retirement he continued to hold important posts such as the Prochancellorship of the University of Surrey.

Notes

1921 births
Engineers from Devonport, Plymouth
People educated at Devonport High School for Boys
Alumni of the University of Birmingham
English chief executives
Commanders of the Order of the British Empire
Knights Bachelor
People associated with the University of Surrey
2004 deaths
20th-century English businesspeople